The Thirsk rail crash occurred on 31 July 1967 at Thirsk, Yorkshire, England on the British Rail East Coast Main Line.

Events
The 12:00 1A26 express train from King's Cross to Edinburgh and Aberdeen collided at speed with the wreckage of a derailed freight train around 15:17 on that day. Seven people were killed and 45 injured, 15 seriously. Following the accident, three of the four lines (the Up [Southbound] and Down [Northbound] Fast lines and the Down Slow line) were blocked by the wreckage of the collision. The Up Slow line was not damaged and was used by special trains to take the dead and injured to Newcastle upon Tyne. The line was also used later that day for both Up and Down trains to clear other trains stranded in the area by the blockage  but was later used only for Up trains, Down trains being diverted via Harrogate over the Harrogate-Northallerton line which, though it had been closed, was re-opened for the purpose. Special bus services were introduced between Leeds and Northallerton and between York and Thirsk to replace local train services disrupted by the accident. Breakdown cranes were ordered from York, Leeds and Gateshead (Newcastle), and the derailed vehicles were cleared from the track by 23:30 on 1 August.

An extract from The Ministry of Transport report into the accident states:

The 45mph limit for the 26 Cemflo wagons in the freight train was lower than the designed limit of 60mph following derailments with this type of wagon, and this was the speed at the time of derailment. After the derailment and separation of his train, the freight train driver ran back to use a telephone on a signal post about 100 yards (90 m) behind his locomotive. He had no time to speak to the signalman before, to his horror, he first heard and then saw 1A26 loom into view and despite heavy braking, strike the fouling wagon. The buffer beam, draw-gear and coupling shackle of this wagon were ripped clean off by the force of the impact and thrown  into an adjacent field.

As 1A26 had approached signal D19, the driver was not accelerating as hard as he normally would have been because he was uneasy about the view ahead—he should have been able to see the next signal but it was obscured by a cloud of smoke or dust and he had instinctively backed off the throttle. As he passed D19 he became aware of the cement wagon across his path about 400 yards (365 m) ahead. He made an emergency application of the train vacuum brake and the locomotive air brake. He operated the sanding gear to increase the grip on the rails and shut down the engine of his locomotive to reduce the risk of fire in case the derailed tank wagon contained flammable liquid as he realised he now had no chance to avoid the collision. As he approached the obstruction he became aware of the freight train guard running back towards him waving a red flag.

On impact the locomotive of 1A26 DP2 lurched to the right and the left hand side of the cab was severely damaged along with the left hand side of the first three coaches, all side-corridor BR Mark 1s. On coaches 2 and 3 this was fortunately on the corridor side, but on the leading coach this was the compartment side and this is where most of the casualties were.

Also at the time an RAF aircraft flying over saw the crash scene and immediately called for help to be sent.

Aftermath
Locomotive DP2 was damaged beyond repair and finally broken up for spares in 1970. 

Locomotive D283, the English Electric type 4 diesel hauling the goods train was undamaged.

Cause and prevention
The wagon derailment was blamed on excessive wear in the suspension components, thought to be caused by cement dust abrasion, in combination with slight variations in both wheel-set diameter and track alignment. This resulted in a typical "waddling", lateral oscillation of "CemFlo" tank wagons. Furthermore, it was a number of other accidents involving suspected poor riding of CemFlo wagons that resulted in progressively more severe speed restrictions being placed on any trains containing this type. At the Thirsk crash, the oscillation built up to such a state that it eventually threw the rear wheel-set of one wagon off the rails, even though the train was travelling below the maximum  permitted for four-wheeled wagons. Indeed, the pronounced waddling of this very train was noted by the signalman at Pilmoor in his log as he recorded its passing about 6 minutes before the derailment. Also at Pilmoor, two men were watching the trains pass. One of them had noted that the leading wheel-set of a wagon "somewhere just forward of the halfway point" had dropped heavily into the gap on a cross-over then rebounded higher than the rest. At the time, although he noted it, he thought little of it, but on hearing of the accident he felt compelled to bring this to the attention of the authorities.

Following the accident, wagon LA201 was selected for rolling-road tests at Doncaster having been judged to be in an almost identical condition to LA223 – the first vehicle to derail in the crash. As speed increased, flange-to-flange hunting (moving from side to side) was noted to set in under both laden and unladen conditions.

Notes

References

Sources

Further reading

External links
Image of DP2 locomotive after the crash

Railway accidents and incidents in Yorkshire
Thirsk rail crash
Thirsk rail crash
Thirsk rail crash, 1967
Rail transport in North Yorkshire
Transport disasters in Yorkshire
Thirsk rail crash
1967 disasters in the United Kingdom
Thirsk rail crash, 1967
Thirsk rail crash
Train collisions in England
Thirsk